Michael Cameron Lawther (born 2 March 1990) is an English/Irish film producer and Assistant Director.

Lawther started his career as an assistant director while also working as an assistant to Brad Pitt on films including World War Z and Fury. He spent time as a set assistant to Kenneth Branagh, Gerard Butler, Jason Statham and F. Gary Gray. He produced the BAFTA nominated and Academy Award shortlisted film, Wale (2018).

He is the brother of actor Alex Lawther.

Filmography

External links
 

English film producers
1990 births
Living people
Mass media people from Winchester